Everyone's Got One is the debut album by English rock band Echobelly. Released to a favourable response from critics, the album reached number 8 in the UK Albums Chart in September 1994. On 21 July 2014, a 2CD expanded edition of the album was released by 3 Loop Music which featured B-sides and previously unreleased live material.

In 2017, Pitchfork placed Everyone's Got One at number 48 on their list of The 50 Best Britpop Albums.

Background
Reflecting her fascination for wordplay, lead singer Sonya Madan titled the album Everyone's Got One, with the first letter of each word spelling "EGO", a common theme throughout the album.

Madan wrote the songs "Today, Tomorrow, Sometime, Never" and "Call Me Names" about her feelings of alienation due to her Indian heritage: "Even though I have a brown skin, I didn't feel Asian. I felt alien". "Father Ruler King Computer" discusses her anger towards arranged marriages: "I was brought up, I've been told, that a husband is the goal. What connotations in these loaded words, a spinster and a bachelor, I am whole all by myself, I don't need nobody else." Other topics covered in her lyrics include empowering women ("Give Her a Gun"), self-confidence ("I Can't Imagine the World Without Me"), a friend's abortion ("Bellyache"), and loneliness ("Close… But").

Track listing

Personnel
Credits adapted from liner notes.

Echobelly
 Sonya Madan – vocals 
 Glenn Johansson – guitars, mandolin, additional vocals
 Debbie Smith – guitar
 Alex Keyser – bass, piano, whistle
 Andy Henderson – drums, percussion

Additional personnel
 Barbara Snow – trumpet ("I Can't Imagine the World Without Me")
 Lino Robinson – piano, string arrangements ("I Can't Imagine the World Without Me")
 Miles Bould – percussion ("Taste of You")
 Audrey Riley – cello ("Taste of You", "Cold Feet Warm Heart")
 Simon Vinestock – production (besides "Insomniac"), re-mixing ("Insomniac")
 Clive Martin – production, engineering ("Insomniac")
 Ronen Tal – engineering (besides "I Can't Imagine the World Without Me" and "Insomniac")
 Nick Addison – engineering ("I Can't Imagine the World Without Me")
 Alan Moulder – mixing ("I Can't Imagine the World Without Me")
 Fauve Music – publishing
 Paul Bailey – management
 Maria Mochnacz – photography
 Stylorouge – designer

 2014 reissue bonus disc
 Echobelly – performance, production (tracks 1–4, 7–8)
 Juju Midget – didgeridoo ("Bellyache")
 Huw Warren – cello ("Sleeping Hitler")
 Dick Meany – production (tracks 1–4)
 Clive Martin – production, engineering (tracks 5–6)
 Nick Addison – engineering (track 7)
 Dick Meany – mixing (track 8)
 Simon Vinestock – production (track 9)
 Sam Cunningham – production (tracks 10–11)
 Miti Adhikari – engineering (tracks 10–11)

References

External links

Everyone's Got One at YouTube (streamed copy where licensed)

1994 debut albums
Echobelly albums